Calliotropis asphales is a species of sea snail, a marine gastropod mollusc in the family Eucyclidae.

Description
The length of the shell reaches 28 mm.

Distribution
This species occurs in the Pacific Ocean off the Solomon Islands.

References

 Vilvens C. (2007) New records and new species of Calliotropis from Indo-Pacific. Novapex 8 (Hors Série 5): 1–72.

External links
 

asphales
Gastropods described in 2007